Diplomatic Enclave may also refer to:

 Chanakyapuri, diplomatic enclave of New Delhi, India
Dwarka, Delhi, diplomatic enclave of New Delhi, India
 Diplomatic Enclave, Islamabad
 Diplomatic Enclave, Brunei